Modern Poland Foundation is a Polish non-governmental organization (NGO) based in Warsaw, focused on building open educational resources, developing free digitalization technologies and influencing public policies in the field of digital rights.

Its main activists include Jarosław Lipszyc.

In 2008 it helped to establish the Koalicja Otwartej Edukacji.

References

External links

Political organisations based in Poland
Organisations based in Warsaw
Free culture movement